Berwick power station may refer to:

Berwick-upon-Tweed Power Station, a demolished coal-fired power station in[North East England
Susquehanna Steam Electric Station, a nuclear power station near Berwick, Pennsylvania
Cockenzie Power Station, a coal-fired power station near North Berwick, Scotland

See also
 Berwick (disambiguation)
 Berwick station (disambiguation)